The Abbott–Decou House was built by Samuel Abbott in 1797 in what is now Hamilton Township, Mercer County, New Jersey.  In 1888 it came into the possession of the DeCou family, whose matriarch, known locally as "Aunt Martha," had a considerable influence in local affairs.  The house is considered a particularly fine example of 18th century Quaker Georgian architecture.

See also
National Register of Historic Places listings in Mercer County, New Jersey

References

Georgian architecture in New Jersey
Houses completed in 1797
National Register of Historic Places in Mercer County, New Jersey
Houses in Mercer County, New Jersey
Hamilton Township, Mercer County, New Jersey
New Jersey Register of Historic Places